Emad El-Din Shafei (29 October 1931 – 16 March 1961) was an Egyptian sprinter. He competed in the men's 100 metres at the 1952 Summer Olympics.

References

1931 births
1961 deaths
Athletes (track and field) at the 1952 Summer Olympics
Egyptian male sprinters
Egyptian male high jumpers
Olympic athletes of Egypt
Place of birth missing